Gervase Cowell  ( – ) was a part of a British husband and wife intelligence team who serviced Colonel Oleg Penkovsky.

Biography
Part of a husband and wife team that serviced the Soviet Spy Colonel Oleg Penkovsky.  After retirement he became chairman of the historical sub-committee of the Special Forces Club, for which work he was made an MBE in the new year's honours list.

Early life

Expanded description

Marriage and children

Death

Recognition

Bibliography
Cowell, G., Special Forces Club., & Great Britain. (1993). Ravensbrück: The women of S.O.E.F Section. London: Special Forces Club.

References/Notes and references

1926 births
2000 deaths
Alumni of St Catharine's College, Cambridge
Alumni of the University of Cambridge
People educated at St Bede's College, Manchester
People from Greater Manchester
Secret Intelligence Service personnel
British diplomats
British expatriates in the Soviet Union
British spies against the Soviet Union
Cold War spies